The 2007 UNCAF Interclub Cup was the 25th edition of the international club football competition held in the UNCAF region representing the seven nations of Central America.  C.D. Motagua obtained their first regional title.  This was the ninth year of the current format using the name UNCAF Interclub Cup.  The tournament was also be a qualifying event for the 2008 CONCACAF Champions' Cup.  The top three finishers in the tournament qualified for the 2008 CONCACAF Champions' Cup.  The official draw took place on June 19 in Guatemala.  This was the last season in this format.

Tournament Bracket

Round of 16

Puntarenas advance 3–0 on aggregate.

Saprissa advance 5–3 on aggregate.

Alajuelense advance 3–0 on aggregate.

Real España advance 4–2 on penalties.

Xelajú advance 4–2 on penalties.

Municipal advance 8–0 on aggregate.

Motagua advance 5–1 on aggregate.

San Francisco advance 1–0 on aggregate.

Quarterfinals

Saprissa advance 3–2 on aggregate.

Alajuelense advance 5–4 on penalties.

Municipal advance 4–1 on penalties.

Motagua advance 2–0 on aggregate.

Semifinals

Saprissa advance 2–1 on aggregate and qualifies to the 2008 CONCACAF Champions' Cup

Motagua advance 6–3 on aggregate and qualifies to the 2008 CONCACAF Champions' Cup

Third place

Municipal wins 3–1 on aggregate and qualifies for the 2008 CONCACAF Champions' Cup

Final

Motagua wins 2–1 on aggregate.

Top goalscorers

Final standings

 Top 3 qualified to the 2008 CONCACAF Champions' Cup.''

Champion

References

UNCAF Interclub Cup
1
2007–08 in Honduran football
2007–08 in Guatemalan football
2007–08 in Costa Rican football
2007–08 in Salvadoran football
2007–08 in Nicaraguan football
2007–08 in Belizean football
2007–08 in Panamanian football